Clostridium algoriphilum  is a psychrophilic, Gram-positive, strict anaerobic, spore-forming and motile bacterium from the genus Clostridium which has been isolated from an over-cooled brine from the permafrost in Kolyma Lowland in Russia.

References

Bacteria described in 2010
algoriphilum
Psychrophiles